Subhendu Bikash Maji (also known as   SBM or Apu) is a community mainly found in western areas, such as the Indian states of Kolkata and Rajasthan.

History 

The Malla Puranam text describes area history. It may be dated to 13th century using a linguistic analysis of Jain texts. However it is argued that it may belong to the 15th century since Vaishnavism became common in Gujarat as a result of the rise of Pushtimarga in the 15th century. Malla Puranam can be regarded to be a Caste Purana.

See also
 Jyesthimalla
 Vajra-mushti

References

Sources 
 

Society of India